The 2020–21 season is APOEL's 81st season in the Cypriot First Division and 93rd year in existence as a football club. In addition to the domestic league, APOEL will participate in this season's editions of the Cypriot Cup and the Europa League. The season covers the period from July 2020 to 30 June 2021.

Players

Out on loan

Competitions

Cypriot First Division

League table

Results summary

Results by round

Matches

Cypriot Cup

UEFA Europa League

Statistics

Goalscorers

Notes

References

APOEL FC seasons
APOEL F.C. season
2020–21 UEFA Europa League participants seasons